Thomas Bruce Niblo (24 September 1878 – 30 June 1933) was a Scottish professional footballer who played as an outside forward and forward. He played the majority of his career in the Football League for Newcastle United, Middlesbrough, Aston Villa and Nottingham Forest. He also played in the Scottish and Southern Leagues and was capped once by Scotland at international level.

Career
After leaving Raith Rovers in 1910, Niblo was one of three signings announced by Southern Football League Second Division side Cardiff City in November of the same year. Having trained with Newcastle United to maintain fitness, he was immediately named in the first team for his debut against Aberdare Athletic. He played three further games for the club before departing shortly after .

Personal life 
Niblo worked as a boilermaker on Tyneside when his football career came to an end. He served as a bombardier in the Royal Field Artillery and the Royal Garrison Artillery during the First World War.

Career statistics

References

1878 births
1933 deaths
Military personnel from Fife
Scottish footballers
Scotland international footballers
Footballers from Dunfermline
Hamilton Academical F.C. players
Linthouse F.C. players
Newcastle United F.C. players
Aston Villa F.C. players
Nottingham Forest F.C. players
Watford F.C. players
Middlesbrough F.C. players
Aberdeen F.C. players
Scottish Football League players
English Football League players
Association football forwards
Southern Football League players
Hebburn Argyle F.C. players
Raith Rovers F.C. players
Cardiff City F.C. players
Blyth Spartans A.F.C. players
Association football outside forwards
Newcastle United F.C. non-playing staff
British Army personnel of World War I
Royal Field Artillery soldiers
Royal Garrison Artillery soldiers
Fulham F.C. wartime guest players
Crystal Palace F.C. wartime guest players